Victor Hănescu (born 21 July 1981) is a former Romanian tennis player. His career-high singles ranking was world no. 26.

Professional career 
Hănescu attained a career-high singles ranking of No. 26 on 6 July 2009. In a Davis Cup match against the United States, he suffered a severe rib injury, and a subsequent injury sidelined him further in May 2006. By January 2007, his ranking had plummeted to No. 759, before he finally began making progress on a comeback.

1999: Pro career begins 
Hănescu earned his first ATP singles ranking points in August 1999, with first-round wins two weeks in a row at the Romania F1 and F2 Futures tournaments. Although he played four more tournaments from September through December, he did not earn any additional points and finished the year ranked No. 1231.

2000: Success in Satellites 
In 2000, Hănescu played Satellites and Futures tournaments. His fourth-place finish at a Satellite in Croatia in April/May and third place at a Satellite in Portugal in October/November provided him with 36 of the 45 ATP singles ranking points he earned in 2000. He finished the year ranked No. 477.

2001: Futures wins and Challenger successes 
Hănescu won his first pro tournaments in May 2001, taking the singles titles in consecutive weeks at the Slovakia F1 and F2 Futures events. A quarterfinal finish at a Challenger in Budapest two weeks later put him in the top 400 for the first time. In July, as the top seed in consecutive weeks in Bucharest, he reached the final at Romania F1 and won the F2 Futures event to improve his ranking to No. 319. In August in Challengers in three consecutive weeks, he reached the semifinals in Poland and Germany, and then the final in Germany to improve to No. 209. He broke into the top 200 for the first time in October, but went just 4–7 in Challengers after August and finished the year ranked No. 212.

2002: First ATP quarter-final, first Challenger win 
Hănescu did not make much career progress in 2002. His highlights were reaching his first career ATP-level quarterfinal at Umag, Croatia in July, and then winning his first Challenger in Portugal in September. He finished the year ranked No. 172.

2003: Top 100, third round French Open and Wimbledon 
Moderate success in Challengers improved Hănescu's ranking to No. 150 by April 2003. He then qualified for the ATP tournament in Estoril and reached the third round of the Rome Masters in May and beat No. 31 Mikhail Youzhny, his highest-ranked win to that point. At the end of May, he qualified for the French Open and reached the third round, losing to Jarkko Nieminen, to break into the top 100 for the first time. He was a lucky loser entry at Wimbledon, and reached the third round there also, beating No. 34 Juan Ignacio Chela before losing to No. 12 Sjeng Schalken, improving his ranking to No. 85. He had limited success the rest of the year, losing in the first round at the US Open to No. 6 Lleyton Hewitt, before reaching the quarterfinals in Bucharest in September. In October, he qualified for his second Masters event of the year in Paris, upsetting No. 49 Rafael Nadal and No. 69 Anthony Dupuis, and then upsetting No. 27 Wayne Ferreira in the first round, before losing to No. 2 Andy Roddick. He finished the year ranked No. 70.

2004: Grand Slam failures, first ATP semifinal, first top-10 win 
Hănescu played almost exclusively at the ATP level in 2004, but with very limited success. He was ranked high enough for direct entry into all four Grand Slams and the Olympics, but won only one match total in those five events. His successes were his first career ATP semifinal in Scottsdale in March, and several more ATP quarterfinals, including Bucharest again in September and Estoril in April, where he recorded his first win over a top-10 player, No. 6 Rainer Schüttler. In October, he went back down to the Challenger level and won in Rome, his second career Challenger title. He finished the year ranked No. 92, down 22 spots from 2003.

2005: Best year, French Open quarterfinals, ATP semifinals 
2005 was Hănescu's best year to date. At the French Open, he beat Michal Tabara in the first round then No. 32 Juan Ignacio Chela in the second round, and then Luis Horna in the third round before he came back to beat No. 11 David Nalbandian in five sets 6–3, 4–6, 5–7, 6–1, 6–2, in the fourth round. He lost to No. 1 Roger Federer in the quarterfinals. He reached ATP semifinals in New Haven (beating No. 58 Nicolás Massú and No. 20 Tommy Robredo, before losing to No. 67 James Blake) and in Bucharest to reach the top 40 for the first time in September. He also had his second career win over a top-10 player, beating No. 10 Mariano Puerta in July, and finished the year with a career high ranking of No. 35.

2006: Lost to injuries 
The rib injury in the Davis Cup match and a subsequent back injury in May sidelined him for most of the year, and after starting the year out at No. 35, he finished up at No. 646. His lone success was winning the ATP-level exhibition tournament in Houston in April, beating Vince Spadea and Juan Mónaco.

2007: A comeback year, first ATP final 
His ranking continued to plummet due mainly to inactivity, as well as poor results when he did play, until March, when he qualified for a Challenger event in Italy and beat No. 126 Björn Phau to reach the second round. His protected ranking status gave him direct entry into a couple ATP events in April, with little success. So he continued to play Challengers, reaching a semifinal and a quarterfinal in May, and then a final in June to get back into the top 300. Finally in August, he won two consecutive Challengers in Romania and Austria to improve to No. 151 by the start of his home ATP stop in Bucharest in September, where he was a semifinalist in 2005; he went one step farther this time by making the finals, losing in three sets to Gilles Simon. It was his first career final.

In December, the ATP entered Hănescu into the 2007 Centuries Club for advancing hundreds of spaces to regain a spot in the top 100 rankings. Hănescu climbed more ranking positions than any other player in the top 100. He finished the year at No. 77.

2008
Hănescu reached the fourth round of the French Open, where he lost to Fernando González 2–6, 4–6, 2–6. He reached the final of the Stuttgart Outdoor in July, only to lose to Jérémy Chardy 6–2, 3–6, 4–6. He reached the quarterfinals in St. Petersburg, losing to Igor Kunitsyn 3–6, 6–3, 6–7. He finished at No. 50.

2009 
Hănescu started off the year by reaching the quarterfinals in Doha, where he lost to Andy Roddick. In Auckland, Hănescu lost in the first round to Juan Mónaco. He reached the second round of the Australian Open, after defeating Jan Hernych, but then fell to Dudi Sela. Hănescu reached the second round in Zagreb. In Dubai, he lost his first-round match. In Miami, he lost to Michael Russell in the first round. Hănescu reached the quarterfinals in Casablanca.
He competed at the 2009 French Open. In the first round, he eliminated Steve Darcis 7–6, 7–6, 7–6, in the second round Mikhail Youzhny 7–5, 7–5, 7–5, and in the third round he upset seventh seed Gilles Simon 6–4, 6–4, 6–2. He next played Fernando González and lost 2–6, 4–6, 2–6.

At Wimbledon, he was seeded 31st. In the first round, he won a grueling match against Iván Navarro 6–3, 6–7, 6–4, 6–7, 12–10. Then he played Nicolas Devilder and won 6–2, 6–3, 6–1, to advance in the third round, where he lost to eighth-seeded Gilles Simon 2–6, 5–7, 2–6. At the 2009 MercedesCup, he reached the final by defeating Dominik Meffert, Rainer Schüttler, Alexandre Sidorenko, and Fabio Fognini in the semifinals. He lost in the final to Jérémy Chardy 6–1, 3–6, 4–6.

2010 
At the 2010 Australian Open, he won his first-round match against Juan Ignacio Chela 6–4, 6–3, 7–6, but then lost in the second round to World No. 1 Roger Federer 2–6, 3–6, 2–6.

He then played at the 2010 BNP Paribas Open, where he won his first-round match against Juan Ignacio Chela 6–3, 7–6, and then lost again to Roger Federer 3–6, 7–6, 1–6.

At the 2010 Internazionali BNL d'Italia, he defeated Michael Berrer 6–2, 6–7, 6–3, in the first round, then Juan Mónaco 7–6, 6–4, to lose in the next round to eventual winner Rafael Nadal 3–6, 2–6.

At ATP Casablanca, April 5, 2010, he was runner up, losing in the final to Stanislas Wawrinka.

2011
Hănescu reached the semifinals in Casablanca, losing there to Potito Starace, 1–6, 7–6, 6–7. He reached the final in Nice, where he lost to Nicolás Almagro, 6–7, 3–6, 3–6. He went out in the second round at the French Open and Wimbledon and had little success for the rest of the year.

In July, he broke an 11-match losing streak to beat then-world no. 7 and top seed Gaël Monfils at the MercedesCup, after saving two match points in the second-set tiebreaker.

2012
Hănescu was defeated in the second round in Chennai by Canadian Milos Raonic, 1–6, 4–6. He also went out in the second round in São Paulo to Nicolás Almagro, who had beaten him in the final in Nice the previous year. He was defeated in the second round in Buenos Aires by upcoming Japanese star Kei Nishikori in three sets.

He reached the semifinals in Marrakech, going down against Slovak Martin Kližan, 5–7, 4–6. He reached the quarterfinals in Barletta, losing to Potito Starace, 5–7, 2–6.

He qualified in Monte Carlo and Madrid, but went out in the first round. He failed to qualify in Rome.

Controversy
At the 2010 Wimbledon Championships, Hănescu was booed and taunted by a group of spectators during his third-round loss to Daniel Brands of Germany. The group allegedly called him a gypsy, a highly derogatory term in Romania. Frustrated due to injury and crowd behaviour, he responded by spitting towards some spectators and received a warning from the umpire. He then deliberately made four service foot faults to lose two points, giving Brands a 3–0 lead in the final set, before retiring. Four spectators were later arrested by police under Section 5 of the Public Order Act. Hănescu was fined US$15,000 for his behavior, the first of its kind in his career.

ATP career finals

Singles: 5 (1 title, 4 runners-up)

Doubles: 4 (2 titles, 2 runners-up)

Performance timelines

Singles 
Current through 2015 Wimbledon Championships.

DoublesCurrent till US Open.

References

External links

 
 
 

1981 births
Hopman Cup competitors
Living people
Romanian male tennis players
Olympic tennis players of Romania
Tennis players at the 2004 Summer Olympics
Tennis players at the 2008 Summer Olympics
Tennis players from Bucharest